Gettupatti is a village in Dharmapuri District of Tamil Nadu State, India.
It comes under Dokkubothanahalli Panchayath and its south regions is covered by thoppur forest.
It is located 20 km towards South from Dharmapuri and 308 km from State capital Chennai.

 

About Village :
Village : Gettupatti 
Panchayath : Dokkubothanahalli 
Taluk Name : Dharmapuri 
District : Dharmapuri 
State : Tamil Nadu 
Country : India 
Language : Tamil 
Time zone: IST (GMT+5:30) 
International Dial ling Code : +91  
Telephone STD Code : 04342 
Pin Code : 636807 
Post Office Name : Gettupatti
Population : Around 7000

Nearest Railway Station :

1. Dharmapuri Junction 
2. Salem Junction 
3. Sivadi 
4. Toppur

Head Passport Office :
1. Chennai

Latitude : 
12 02’ 
Longitudes :
78 07’

Nearest Airports : 
1. Salem Airport 
2. Coimbatore Airport 
3. Bangalore International Airport 
4. Chennai International Airport

Nearest Cities : 
1. Salem 
2. Dharmapuri 
3. Mettur

Nearest Tourist Places : 
1. Hokenakkal Falls 
2. Mettur Dam 
3. Athiyamaan Palace 
4. Theerthamalai Temple 
5. Hanumanthathirtham 
6. Subramanya Siva Memorial

Available Buses : 
1. 5A 
2. 15 
Just Two KM away from National Highway (NH7) National Highway Bus Stop Name is Thoppur Toll plaza

Nearest Villages : 
1. Samichettipatti 
2. Vellakal 
3. Jaruku 
4. Thathanaikkanpatti. 
5. Thoppur

Nearest Colleges : 
1. Government Medical Colleague 
2. Government Arts and Science Colleague 
3. Jayalakshmi Institute Of Technology 
4. Lakshmi Narayaana Polytechnic Colleague. 
5. vijay vidyalaya Women's Colleague

Nearest Schools :

1. Government High School (Gettupatti) 
2. Government Higher Secondary School (palayampudur) 
3. Government Higher Secondary School (Elagiri) 
4. SVG Martic Hr. Sec. School 
5. Unity Matric Hr. Sec. School

Thopaiyaru dam

Villages in Dharmapuri district